This is a complete list of French flying aces of World War I.

While Roland Garros is often called the first French Ace, he has only four confirmed victories. The distinction of being the first French Ace goes to Adolphe Pégoud.

Aces are listed after verifying the date and location of combat, and the foe vanquished, for every victory accredited by the Aéronautique Militaire using their own aerial victory standards. Those victories for which the evidence is unavailable or fragmentary have been excluded from the victory count.

20 or more victories

 René Fonck
 Georges Guynemer
 Charles Nungesser
 Georges Madon
 Maurice Boyau
 Michel Coiffard
 Léon Bourjade
 Armand Pinsard
 René Dorme
 Gabriel Guérin
 Marcel Haegelen
 Pierre Marinovitch
 Alfred Heurtaux
 Albert Deullin

15-19 victories

 Jacques Ehrlich
 Henri Hay De Slade
 Bernard Barny de Romanet
 Jean Chaput
 Gervais Raoul Lufbery
 Armand de Turenne
 Gilbert Sardier

11-14 victories

 Marius Ambrogi
 Jean Casale
 Omer Demeuldre
 Hector Garaud
 Marcel Nogues
 Bernard Artigau
 Gustave Daladier
 Joseph M. X. de Sévin
 Fernand Guyou
 Marcel A. Hugues
 Lucien J. Jailler
 Adrien L. J. Leps
 Charles J. V. Macé
 Jean Navarre
 Charles Nuville
 Paul Tarascon
 Paul Y. R. Waddington
 Armond J. Berthelot
 Jean G. Bouyer
 Jean Bozon-Verduraz
 André Julien Chainat
 André Herbelin
 William Herisson
 Maxime Lenoir
 Ernest Maunoury
 René Montrion
 Jacques Ortoli

10 victories

 Maurice Bizot
 Lucien Gasser
 Auguste Lahoulle
 Jean André Pezon
 Charles Quette
 Laurent B. Ruamps

9 victories

 Fernand Bonneton
 Alexandre Bretillon
 Arthur Coadou
 Théophile Henri Condemine
 Mathieu Tenant de la Tour
 Marcel Marc Dhome
 Gustave Douchy
 René Dousinelle
 Georges Lachmann
 Jean Matton
 Henri Albert Péronneau
 Marcel Viallet

8 victories

 Paul Barbreau
 Dieudonné Costes
 Gilbert de Guingand
 Georges Flachaire
 Jean Alfred Fraissinet
 Jacques Gerard
 Louis Prosper Gros
 Julien Guertiau
 Antoine Laplasse
 André-Henri Martenot de Cordou
 Robert Massenet-Royer de Marancour
 Edmond Pillon
 Roger Poupon
 Paul Sauvage
 Del Vial

7 victories

 Alfred Auger
 François Battesti
 André Louis Bosson
 Eugene Camplan
 Fernand Henri Chavannes
 Pierre De Cazenove De Pradines
 Pierre Delage
 Robert Delannoy
 François Delzenne
 François de Rochechouart
 Noël de Rochefort
 Jean Derode
 René Doumer
 Pierre Ducornet
 Raoul Echard
 Henri Languedoc
 Marie Lecoq De Kerland
 Jean Loste
 Alexandre Marty
 Xavier Moissinac
 Pierre Pendaries
 Paul Petit
 Jean C. Romatet
 Paul Santelli
 Victor Sayaret
 Gabriel Thomas
 Marie Vitalis
 Joseph Vuillemin
 Eugène Weismann

6 victories

 Albert Chabrier
 Louis Coudouret
 Jules Covin
 François de Boigne
 Joseph De Bonnefoy
 Lionel de Marmier
 André Dubonnet
 Pierre Dufaur de Gavardie
 Paul Gastin
 Maurice Gond
 Marcel Henriot
 André Robert Lévy
 Louis Martin
 Gustave Naudin
 Adolphe Pégoud
 Émile Régnier
 Achille Rousseaux
 Constant Soulier

5 victories

 Albert Achard
 Maurice Arnoux
 Jean Arpheuil
 Yves F. Barbaza
 Andre Barcat
 Auguste Baux
 Georges Blanc
 Marcel Bloch
 Charles Borzecki
 Alexandre Buisson
 Pierre Cardon
 Lucien Cayol
 Antoine Cordonnier
 Honoré de Bonald
 Jean de Gaillard de la Valdène
 Andre Delorme
 Jean Dubois de Gennes
 Jean-Paul Favre de Thierrens
 Pierre Gauderman
 Eugène Gilbert
 Francis Guerrier
 Joseph-Henri Guiguet
 Georges Halberger
 Paul Hamot
 Marius Hasdenteufel
 Marcel Hauss
 Paul Homo
 Jean Jannekeyn
 Didier Lecour Grandmaison
 Pierre Le Roy de Boiseaumarié
 Georges Lienhart
 Paul Malavialle
 Paul Montange
 Antoine Paillard
 Georges Pelletier d'Oisy
 Andre Petit-Delchet
 Constant Plessis
 François Portron
 Georges Raymond
 Victor Regnier
 Charles Revol-Tissot
 Louis Rissacher
 Maurice Robert
 Paul Rodde
 Jacques Roques
 Maurice Rousselle
 Basile Saune
 Etienne Tsu
 Gilbert J. Uteau
 Pierre Violet-Marty
 Pierre Wertheim

Notes

References
Notes

Bibliography